Mount Spurr (Dena'ina: K'idazq'eni) is a stratovolcano in the Aleutian Arc of Alaska, named after United States Geological Survey geologist and explorer Josiah Edward Spurr, who led an expedition to the area in 1898. The Alaska Volcano Observatory (AVO) currently rates Mount Spurr as Level of Concern Color Code Green. The mountain is known aboriginally by the Dena'ina Athabascan name K'idazq'eni, literally 'that which is burning inside'.

Mount Spurr, the highest volcano of the Aleutian Arc, is a large lava dome constructed at the center of a roughly 5 km-wide horseshoe-shaped caldera that is open to the south. The volcano lies 80.87 miles west of Anchorage and NE of Chakachamna Lake. The caldera was formed by a late-Pleistocene or early Holocene debris avalanche and associated pyroclastic flows that destroyed an ancestral Spurr volcano. The debris avalanche traveled more than 15.5 miles to the SE, and the resulting deposit contains blocks as large as 100m in diameter. Several ice-carved post-caldera domes lie in the caldera. Present Mt. Spurr is the highest of the post-caldera.  This regrown summit peak of Spurr experienced a heating event in 2004 which created a small crater lake.  By 2008, the summit crater had cooled enough to have begun to have accumulated significant amounts of snow again.  The youngest post-caldera dome, Crater Peak (2309m, 7575 ft), formed at the breached southern end of the caldera about 3.2 km south of Spurr, has been the source of about 40 identified Holocene tephra layers. Spurr's two historical eruptions, from Crater Peak in 1953 and 1992, deposited ash on the city of Anchorage. Crater Peak has a summit crater that is itself slightly breached along the south rim; the north wall of the crater exposes the truncated remains of an older dome or lava lake. Before the 1992 eruption, a small crater lake occupied the bottom of Crater Peak's crater.

As with other Alaskan volcanoes, the proximity of Spurr to major trans-Pacific aviation routes means that an eruption of this volcano can significantly disrupt air travel.  Volcanic ash can cause jet engines to fail.

Recent activity
On July 26, 2004, the AVO raised the "Color Concern Code" at Spurr from green to yellow due to an increasing number of earthquakes.  Earthquakes beneath a volcano may indicate the movement of magma preceding a volcanic eruption, but the earthquakes might also die out without an eruption.  In the first week of August 2004, the AVO reported the presence of a collapse pit, filled with water forming a new crater lake, in the ice and snow cover on the summit. This lake may have been caused by an increase in heat flow through the summit lava dome.

On May 3, 2005, a debris flow was observed in webcam images, as well as by a nearby pilot. A subsequent overflight revealed that much of the sitting pond within the melt hole had drained away, a notable depth.

References

External links

 Volcano World article about Spurr
 Mount Spurr Webcam

Volcanoes of Kenai Peninsula Borough, Alaska
Mountains of Kenai Peninsula Borough, Alaska
Mountains of Alaska
Stratovolcanoes of the United States
Subduction volcanoes
Volcanoes of Alaska
Active volcanoes
Volcanic crater lakes
20th-century volcanic events
Calderas of Alaska